"The Next Decade" is the thirty-fifth single by Japanese musical artist Gackt, released on August 11, 2009.

Summary
It was used as the theme song for the Kamen Rider Series film Kamen Rider Decade: All Riders vs. Dai-Shocker in which Gackt portrays Riderman. It was released as a CD single and a CD single coupled with a DVD of the music video.

CD

DVD
The music video of "The Next Decade" was later released in Stay the Ride Alive, as a "special memorial single" version which is a Digipak with a special cover, a third disc and a booklet describing Gackt's collaboration with the Kamen Rider Decade production.

 "The Next Decade" music cinema film

Charts
On its first day of release, it hit #3 on the Oricon Daily Charts after selling 13,000 copies.

Oricon

Billboard Japan

References

External links
Kamen Rider Decade on Avex Mode's official website

Film theme songs
2009 singles
Gackt songs
Japanese film songs
Songs with lyrics by Shoko Fujibayashi
2009 songs